Salahuddin Tunio is a Pakistani actor in television and film. He is the father of Fahad Mustafa.

Early life and education
Tunio was born to Muhammad Ibrahim Tunio on February 28, 1949, in a village Dhanibux Tunio near Qambar.

Career

Dramas
He acted in various Sindhi and Urdu TV channels drama.

Filmography

References 

Sindhi people
University of Sindh alumni
1949 births
Living people